The 2020 Alabama A&M Bulldogs football team represented Alabama Agricultural and Mechanical University in the 2020–21 NCAA Division I FCS football season. The Bulldogs were led by third-year head coach Connell Maynor and played their home games at Louis Crews Stadium in Huntsville, Alabama as members of the East Division of the Southwestern Athletic Conference. On July 20, 2020, the Southwestern Athletic Conference announced that it would not play fall sports due to the COVID-19 pandemic.

On May 3, 2021, A&M was voted HBCU National Champions by the BOXTOROW Coaches and Media Polls, after finishing the season undefeated. Their selections marks the first time in history the Bulldogs finished the season ranked as the #1 team in black college football. A&M ended ranked #19 in the 2020–21 Division I FCS Coaches Poll, head coach Maynor was a finalist for the Eddie Robinson Award for the top coach in FCS, and QB Aqeel Glass was a finalist for Walter Payton Award for best FCS player.

Schedule
Due to the SWAC's postponement of the 2020 football season to spring 2021, games against Mississippi State, Stephen F. Austin, and UAB were canceled. The SWAC released updated spring schedules on August 17. Initially, A&M's spring schedule featured 6 games, 3 away, 2 home and the Magic City Classic. The Bulldogs won their first game via forfeit after Alcorn opted out of their spring season. Additionally, games against Mississippi Valley State and Prairie View A&M were postponed and later canceled due to COVID cases in their respective programs. On March 3, the Bulldogs added a non-conference game against South Carolina State. Their last scheduled home contest against Grambling State was also canceled without a makeup game schedule. Alabama A&M lost its final opportunity to host a game at Louis Crews Stadium when the SWAC moved its championship game to a neutral site due to confusion over tiebreakers as a result of COVID related cancellations.

Game summaries

at South Carolina State

at Jackson State

vs. Alabama State

vs. Arkansas–Pine Bluff

Postseason honors

Deacon Jones Trophy/Black College Football Player of the Year
QB Aqeel Glass

BOXTOROW HBCU Player of the Year
QB Aqeel Glass

BOXTOROW HBCU All-American First-Team
QB	Aqeel Glass
OL	Jonathan Williams
WR	Abdul-Fatai Ibrahim
DL	Marcus Cushnie

BOXTOROW HBCU All-American Honorable Mention
RB	Gary Quarles
WR	Zabrian Moore

SWAC Player of the Year
QB Aqeel Glass

All-SWAC First Team
QB	Aqeel Glass
OL	Dexter Fuqua
WR	Abdul-Fatai Ibrahim
DL	Marcus Cushnie

All-SWAC Second Team
RB	Gary Quarles
OL	Antearius Harrington
OL	Jonathan Williams
WR	Zabrian Moore
LB	Armoni Holloway
DB	Amari Holloway
K	Spencer Corey

References

Alabama AandM
Alabama A&M Bulldogs football seasons
Black college football national champions
Southwestern Athletic Conference football champion seasons
College football undefeated seasons
Alabama AandM Bulldogs football